Malkot  is a village development committee in Kalikot District in the Karnali Zone of north-western Nepal.

References

External links
UN map of the municipalities of Kalikot District

Populated places in Kalikot District